The EMS Synthi A and the EMS Synthi AKS are portable modular analog synthesisers made by EMS of England. The Synthi A model debuted in May 1971, and then Synthi AKS model appeared in March 1972 a with a built-in keyboard and sequencer. The EMS Synthi models are notable for its patch pin matrix, its functions and internal design are similar to the VCS 3 synthesiser, also made by EMS. EMS is still run by Robin Wood in Cornwall, and in addition to continuing to build and sell new units, the company repairs and refurbishes EMS equipment.

When launched in 1972, the Synthi AKS retailed for around £450.  There was an optional three octave (37 note) DK1 monophonic keyboard available for it, later the DK2 (Dynamic Keyboard 2) was available, this allowed independent control of two Oscillators, thus enabling the player to play two notes together. The Synthi instruments were used widely in progressive rock and electronic music. 

As with the VCS3, a Synthi AKS was worth considerably more than its original price by the late 1970s. In 2020, the average price for a Synthi AKS in good condition was around US$20,000 on the international market.

Use
The Synthi AKS has been used extensively by Brian Eno in his art rock and ambient albums. He particularly made prominent use of its signal-chain editing capability in order to add colour to his own voice as well as Robert Fripp and Phil Manzanera's guitar work. His early band, Roxy Music, supposedly requested that he join them after watching him tinker with the Synthi AKS for only a few minutes.

Tangerine Dream used several Synthi AKS's throughout the early 1970s.

Jean-Michel Jarre featured the Synthi AKS on his albums Oxygène and Équinoxe, as well as on Oxygène: Live in Your Living Room.

Pink Floyd used the synthesiser to create the electronic riff of the track "On the Run" and to play the solo of "Any Colour You Like", both from the 1973 album The Dark Side of the Moon. (The band was reported to use an EMS VCS 3 synthesizer although it actually was a Synthi).

Jorge Antunes used Synthi A throughout the early 1970s with his ensemble GEMUNB Grupo de Experimentação Musical da Universidade de Brasília.

Czesław Niemen in 1975 used Synthi AKS in recording of his album Katharsis.

Tone Generator Aka Dom Guerin AKS synthesizer on  SPK (band) Information Overload Unit & subsequent tours of US & England.

Klaus Schulze and Pete Namlook refer to Synthi AKS in the name of their collaboration album The Dark Side of the Moog VIII: Careful With the AKS, Peter.

Kraftwerk Florian Schneider used one to process his flute on early albums including Radio-Activity in 1974.

In 1980, American pop band The Bongos used the Synthi AKS on both sides of their debut single "Telephoto Lens" b/w "Glow in the Dark", played by Dennis Kelley. In 2010, lead singer Richard Barone again used the Synthi on his album Glow, produced by Tony Visconti. It is featured prominently on the song "Yet Another Midnight".

In 2013, a Japanese artist Yoshio Machida made an album "Music from the SYNTHI". This album was made by only Synthi AKS.

In 2017 Jean-Marc Foussat and Georgios Karamanolakis released a 12-inch experimental record lp "Substunce sans Scrupule" that was composed solely of two (2) Ems Synthi AKS machines  and an EMS phase shifter unit.

References

Notable EMS Synthi AKS users
Alessandro Cortini
Andy Whitmore (Greystoke Studios)
Brian Eno
David Gilmour (Abbey Road Studios)
Mark Mothersbaugh
Richard Wright (Abbey Road Studios) 

 Tone Generator of SPK (band)

External links
EMS's homepage
Info on EMS units (AKS in particular)

Synthi AKS